Radek Mezlík (born 20 May 1982) is a Czech football player who played for Slovácko. He represented the Czech Republic at under-17 level.

References

External links
 Profile at iDNES.cz

1982 births
Living people
Czech footballers
Czech First League players
FC Zbrojovka Brno players
SFC Opava players
1. FC Slovácko players

Association football defenders